Mannuronic acid is a uronic acid monosaccharide that can be derived from mannose. Along with -guluronic acid, -mannuronic acid is a component of alginic acid, a polysaccharide found predominantly in brown algae. Mannuronic acid is also incorporated into some bacterial capsular polysaccharides.

References 

Uronic acids